A heterogram (from hetero-, meaning 'different', + -gram, meaning 'written') is a word, phrase, or sentence in which no letter of the alphabet occurs more than once. The terms isogram and nonpattern word have also been used to mean the same thing. 

It is not clear who coined or popularized the term "heterogram". The concept appears in Dmitri Borgmann's 1965 book Language on Vacation: An Olio of Orthographical Oddities but he uses the term isogram. In a 1985 article, Borgmann claims to have "launched" the term isogram then. He also suggests an alternative term, asogram, to avoid confusion with lines of constant value such as contour lines, but uses isogram in the article itself.

Isogram has also been used to mean a string where each letter present is used the same number of times. Multiple terms have been used to describe words where each letter used appears a certain number of times. For example, a word where every featured letter appears twice, like "Shanghaiings", might be called a pair isogram, a second-order isogram, or a 2-isogram.

A perfect pangram is an example of a heterogram, with the added restriction that it uses all the letters of the alphabet.

Uses in ciphers

Heterograms can be useful as keys in ciphers, since heterogram sequences of the same length make for simple one-to-one mapping between the symbols. Ten-letter heterograms like PATHFINDER, DUMBWAITER, and BLACKHORSE are commonly used by salespeople of products where the retail price is typically negotiated, such as used cars, jewelry, or antiques. 

For example, using the PATHFINDER cipher, P represents 1, A represents 2 and so on. The price tag for an item selling for $1200 may also bear the cryptic letters FRR, written on the back or bottom of the tag. A salesman familiar with the PATHFINDER cipher will know that the original cost of the item was $500, so that if the price is negotiated he will not accidentally eliminate all of the 140% margin in the $1200 price shown to prospective buyers.

A twelve-letter cipher could be used to indicate months of the year.

Longest examples 
In the book Language on Vacation: An Olio of Orthographical Oddities, Dmitri Borgmann tries to find the longest such word. The longest one he found was "dermatoglyphics" at 15 letters. He coins several longer hypothetical words, such as "thumbscrew-japingly" (18 letters, defined as "as if mocking a thumbscrew") and, with the "uttermost limit in the way of verbal creativeness", "pubvexingfjord-schmaltzy" (23 letters, defined as "as if in the manner of the extreme sentimentalism generated in some individuals by the sight of a majestic fjord, which sentimentalism is annoying to the clientele of an English inn").

In the book Making the Alphabet Dance, Ross Eckler reports the word "subdermatoglyphic" (17 letters) can be found in an article by Lowell Goldsmith called Chaos: To See a World in a Grain of Sand and a Heaven in a Wild Flower. He also found the name "Melvin Schwarzkopf" (17 letters), a man living in Alton, Illinois, and proposed the name "Emily Jung Schwartzkopf" (21 letters). In an elaborate story, Eckler talked about a group of scientists who name the unavoidable urge to speak in pangrams the "Hjelmqvist-Gryb-Zock-Pfund-Wax syndrome".

The longest German heterogram is "Heizölrückstoßabdämpfung" (heating oil recoil dampening) which uses 24 of the 30 letters in the German alphabet, as ä, ö, ü, and ß are considered distinct letters from a, o, u, and s in German. It is closely followed by "Boxkampfjuryschützlinge" (boxing-match jury protégés) and "Zwölftonmusikbücherjagd" (twelve-tone music book chase) with 23 letters.

Other examples

Words

17 letters 

 subdermatoglyphic

16 letters 

uncopyrightables

15 letters 

dermatoglyphics
hydropneumatics
misconjugatedly
uncopyrightable

14 letters 

ambidextrously
computerizably
croquet-playing
dermatoglyphic
hydromagnetics
hydropneumatic
pseudomythical
subformatively
troublemakings
undiscoverably

13 letters 

consumptively
copyrightable
documentarily
draughtswomen
endolymphatic
flamethrowing
flowchartings
hydromagnetic
lycanthropies
metalworkings
misconjugated
motherfucking
multibranched
overadjusting
subordinately
troublemaking
uncombatively
uncopyrighted
unmaledictory
unpredictably
unproblematic
unsympathized

12 letters 

adsorptively
ambidextrous
amblygonites
amylopectins
bankruptcies
blastodermic
bluestocking
cabinetworks
centrifugals
computerniks
configurated
considerably
counterplays
countervails
customizable
demographics
demonstrably
descrambling
discountable
discrepantly
disreputably
doublethinks
drumbeatings
earthmovings
edulcorating
euchromatins
exclusionary
exculpations
expurgations
exhaustingly
farsightedly
flexographic
flowcharting
Francophiles
gourmandizes
granulocytes
hematoxylins
housewarming
hydromancies
hypnotizable
hyponatremic
imponderably
incomputable
incomputably
kymographies
lexicography
Lubavitchers
lycanthropes
malnourished
mendaciously
metalworking
multipronged
neurotypical
nightwalkers
outpreaching
outscreaming
outsparkling
outspreading
overhaulings
overmatching
overstudying
overwatching
packinghouse
patchworking
pelargoniums
phagocytized
phagocytizes
phytoalexins
polycentrism
preadjusting
postcardlike
problematics
productively
questionably
recognizably
ropewalkings
stakeholding
stenographic
stickhandler
subnormality
subvocalized
thunderclaps
unforgivable
unforgivably
unglamorized
unhysterical
unprofitable
unprofitably
upholstering
voluntaryism
xylographies

There are hundreds of eleven-letter isograms, over one thousand ten-letter isograms and thousands of such nine-letter words.

Phrases and sentences 

 Cwm fjord bank glyphs vext quiz. (26, perfect pangram)
 Blocky dwarf zings the jump. (A. Maag) (23)
 Nymphs beg for quick waltz. (Angus Walker) (22)
 The big dwarf only jumps. (Alain Brobecker) (20)

In French 

 Le bon Giscard! (12)
 Lampez un fort whisky! (Alain Brobecker) (18)
 Plombez vingt fuyards! (Alain Brobecker) (19)

In German 

 "Fix, Schwyz!", quäkt Jürgen blöd vom Paß. (30)
 Malitzschkendorf (16): German city

In Danish 

 Høj bly gom vandt fræk sexquiz på wc. (29, perfect pangram)

In Portuguese 

 Velho traduz, sim! (14)

In Spanish 

Centrifugadlos (14, longest heterogramatic word in Spanish)

See also 
 Pangram

References

External links 

 

Word games
Word play